Jiangsu Yangtze Metropolitan Belt intercity railway system is a network of 8 regional railways surrounding southern parts of  Jiangsu province, China. It is a plan for the gradual implementation of a regional rail system across the region. The system involves Nanjing, Zhenjiang, Changzhou, Wuxi, Suzhou, Yangzhou, Taizhou, Nantong, it aims to form a convenient, fast, safe and efficient intercity rail transportation network.

Intercity railway routes

Operational lines
 Shanghai–Nanjing intercity railway
 Line S1 (Nanjing Metro) and Line S9 (Nanjing Metro) (together forms the Nanjing–Gaochun intercity railway)
 Line S3 (Nanjing Metro) (Nanjing–He County intercity railway)
 Line S8 (Nanjing Metro) (Nanjing–Tianchang intercity railway)

Lines under construction or planned
 Line S6 (Nanjing Metro) (Nanjing–Jurong intercity railway)
 Line S5 (Nanjing Metro) (Nanjing–Yizheng–Yangzhou intercity railway)
 Line S1 (Wuxi Metro) (Wuxi–Jiangyin intercity railway)
 Line S2 (Wuxi Metro) (Wuxi–Yixing intercity railway)
 Suzhou–Wuxi Shuofang Airport intercity railway

References

High-speed railway lines in China
Rail transport in Jiangsu